Giorgos Vasos Vassiliou (born 20 May 1931) is a Greek Cypriot politician who served as the third president of Cyprus from 1988 to 1993. He was also the founder and leader of the Cypriot United Democrats party (EDI) and a highly successful businessman.

Early life
Vassiliou was born in Famagusta, Cyprus. His father, Vasos, was a member of the central committee of AKEL, the Cypriot communist party. He was a doctor by profession, and volunteered as a doctor on the side of the Communists in the Greek Civil War. During the civil war, the rest of the Vassiliou family settled in Hungary. Vassiliou himself went to university in Hungary and was a student of Imre Nagy. He fled Hungary following the Soviet invasion and continued his studies at the University of London. In 2018, György Markó's book The Rambo of Pest revealed that Vassiliou was a spy of the counter-intelligence in the Rákosi era, and after 1956 he was an informer of the Ministry of Interior under the name 'Gergely', and he reported on the economist János Kornai, among others.

Political career
He was elected president as an independent candidate with support from AKEL in 1988, succeeding Spyros Kyprianou, who had served two presidential terms. During his time in office, Cyprus experienced economic growth and he was responsible for a number of reforms including stopping the police practice of keeping files on Cypriot citizens' political beliefs. He worked towards a negotiated solution to the Cyprus dispute based on the Ghali set of ideas, although the dispute remained unresolved by the time he left office in 1993.

After he lost the 1993 elections to Glafkos Klerides, he founded the Free Democrats Movement and he was elected president of the party. He was elected member of the Cypriot Parliamient, while his political party won two seats (out of 56) in the Parliamentary Elections in 1996. The same year the party was merged with the political party ADISOK and formed a new party United Democrats.

He elected as well president of United Democrats and remained president until 2005. In the Parliamentary Elections of 2001 his party lost one of its seats and he wasn't re-elected. Following the Cyprus referendum of 2004 in which he was a strong supporter of the Annan Plan he resigned from the presidency of United Democrats.

He has also served as Chief Negotiator for the accession of Cyprus to the European Union from 1998 to 2003.

Euro-Centrism
He is a strong supporter of the European cause, he proved it recently by co-signing George Soros' open letter calling for more Europe in the single currency turmoil.

George Vassiliou takes active part in international political and social organizations and events. He is currently Member of the European Council on Tolerance and Reconciliation, jointly chaired by Poland's ex-President Aleksander Kwaśniewski and President of the European Jewish Congress Viatcheslav Moshe Kantor. ECTR is designed to monitor tolerance in Europe and prepare recommendations to national governments and IGOs in respect of fighting xenophobia, extremism and anti-Semitism.

Personal life
Vassiliou has three children and is married to Androulla Vassiliou.

In 2014, Vassiliou published a book about his life before presidency called 'Odyssey'. In 2015, he began writing a sequel to his book about his life as president of Cyprus.

Honours

Foreign honours 
 : Honorary Companion of Honour of the National Order of Merit (28 June 1991)
 : Knight Grand Cross of the Order of Merit.
 : Grand Cross of the National Order of the Legion of Honour.
 : Knight Grand Cross of the Order of the Redeemer.
 : Knight of Grand Cross of the Order of Merit of the Italian Republic.
 : Grand Collar of the Order of Prince Henry.
 : Knight Grand Collar of the Order of the Nile.

References

Further reading
 The Economist (US) | 27 February 1988 article "His own man, Cypriot President George Vassiliou"

External links
 Arcadia
 Country Studies
 A new era of Cyprus

1931 births
Living people
20th-century presidents of Cyprus
Alumni of the University of London
Leaders of political parties in Cyprus
People from Famagusta
United Democrats politicians